Mohsen Pirhadi (born in 1980 in Tehran), is one of the representatives of the people of Tehran in the Islamic Consultative Assembly who is an observer and member of the presidium of the 11th parliament and the managing director of Resalat newspaper. This Iranian Shia Twelver principlist representative was a member and secretary (member of the board) of the fourth term of Tehran City Council (2013-2017), which was on the list of "settlers of Islamic Iran" in the elections of this term. In the elections of the 11th term of the Islamic Consultative Assembly (the Parliament of Iran), he finally entered the Islamic Consultative Assembly and was on the unity list of Mohammad Bagher Ghalibaf at the mentioned elections.

Backgrounds and Positions 
Among the backgrounds and positions of Mohsen Pirhadi are:
Member of the Board of the 4th term of the Islamic Council of Tehran
Chairman of the Supervision Committee of the Supervision and Legal Commission of the Islamic Council of Tehran
Member of the commission of paragraph 20 of the Islamic Council of Tehran
Head of Tehran Municipality Basij Organization, Deputy Information Officer of Crisis Prevention and Management Headquarters, District 7, Tehran Municipality
Deputy of Urban Planning and Development, Cultural and Artistic Organization, District 6, Tehran Municipality
Lecturer at the University of Applied Sciences
Lecturer at Payame Noor University
Director of Commercial Affairs of the Guild Council of the country
Secretary of the first banquet plan in the country
Deputy of Social and Cultural Affairs of Region 3 of Tehran Municipality
Deputy of Social and Cultural Affairs of District 7 of Tehran Municipality
Head of the Research and Investigation Department of the Islamic Consultative Assembly based in ... Azad University
Financial director and accountant of the Faculty of Tourism, owned by the Iran Tourism Organization
Teaching in the news universities of the Radio and Television of the Islamic Republic of Iran
Executive Director of the Social Victims Organization Headquarters of Tehran Municipality
Responsible for setting up the Justice Assessment Secretariat in Tehran
Lecturer of the Faculty of News (Islamic Republic of Iran News Agency)
Instructor of Tehran Municipality Basij Organization Training Center
Chairman of the Board of the Book Exchange Center
Owner and managing director of Omid city weekly
Teaching in university jihad centers
Managing Director of Resalat Newspaper

See also 
 Morteza Aghatehrani
 Elias Naderan

References 

Members of the 11th Islamic Consultative Assembly
1980 births
Living people